Dennis Blair may refer to:
Dennis Blair (baseball) (born 1954), former Major League Baseball pitcher
Dennis Blair (comedian) (born 1955), American stand-up comedian
Dennis Blair (cricketer) (born 1934), Australian cricketer
Dennis Blair (footballer) (born 1951), former Australian rules footballer
Dennis C. Blair (born 1947), former U.S. Director of National Intelligence and retired U.S. Navy admiral